The Shuangjiangkou Dam, also referred to as Shuang Jiang Kou, is an embankment dam currently being constructed in a gorge on the Dadu River in Sichuan Province, China. When completed, the  dam will be the tallest dam in the world. Preliminary construction began in 2008 and the entire project was expected to be complete in 2018. In March 2013, China's Ministry of Environmental Protection approved construction on the dam's superstructure and associated facilities. The government acknowledged that the dam would have negative impacts on the environment but that developers were working to mitigate them. The dam is being built by the Guodian Group at a cost of US$4.02 billion. The entire construction period is expected to last 10 years. All turbines are expected to be commissioned by 2023.

Design
Normal reservoir elevation will be  and minimum . The dam's power station will contain four 500 MW Francis turbine-generators for an installed capacity of 2000 MW. Firm capacity of the power station is expected to be 503 MW along with the station operating for 4064 hours each year.

See also 

 List of dams and reservoirs in China
 List of tallest dams in the world
 List of power stations in China

References

Hydroelectric power stations in Sichuan
Dams in China
Dams under construction in China
Rock-filled dams
Dams on the Dadu River
Ngawa Tibetan and Qiang Autonomous Prefecture